La Punt Chamues-ch railway station is a railway station on the Bever–Scuol-Tarasp line in the Engadin valley of the eastern Swiss Alps in southeastern Switzerland, serving the municipality of La Punt Chamues-ch in the canton of Graubünden. Hourly services operate on this line.

Services
The following services stop at La Punt Chamues-ch:

References

External links
 
 

Railway stations in Graubünden
Rhaetian Railway stations
La Punt Chamues-ch
Railway stations in Switzerland opened in 1913